The 2006–07 season was Fulham's sixth consecutive season in the Premier League.

Season summary
Fulham started the season well and looked to be challenging for a mid-table place at least, but a slump towards the end of the season, with one win in 18 games, saw Fulham sucked into the relegation battle. Manager Chris Coleman paid for the club's poor form with his job in April. His replacement, Northern Ireland manager Lawrie Sanchez, did little to stop the rot, but managed to secure Fulham's Premiership status with a 1–0 win over a Liverpool side preparing for the Champions League final, with January signing Clint Dempsey scored the crucial goal. At the end of the season, Sanchez was rewarded for his efforts with a three-year contract, which necessitated his resignation as Northern Ireland manager.

Players

First-team squad
Squad at end of season

Left club during season

Reserve squad
Squad at end of season

Statistics

Appearances and goals

|-
! colspan=14 style=background:#dcdcdc; text-align:center| Goalkeepers

|-
! colspan=14 style=background:#dcdcdc; text-align:center| Defenders

|-
! colspan=14 style=background:#dcdcdc; text-align:center| Midfielders

|-
! colspan=14 style=background:#dcdcdc; text-align:center| Forwards

|-
! colspan=14 style=background:#dcdcdc; text-align:center| Players transferred or loaned out during the season

|-

Starting 11
Considering starts in all competitions
 GK: #30,  Antti Niemi, 31
 RB: #7,  Liam Rosenior, 41
 CB: #16,  Zat Knight, 23 (#19,  Ian Pearce, also has 23 starts)
 CB: #3,  Carlos Bocanegra, 30
 LB: #4,  Franck Queudrue, 31
 RM: #2,  Moritz Volz, 29
 CM: 14,  Papa Bouba Diop, 21
 CM: #8,  Michael Brown, 37
 LM: #13,  Tomasz Radzinski, 30
 CF: #20,  Brian McBride, 38
 CF: #9,  Heiðar Helguson, 20

Transfers

In

Out

Club

Management

Other information

Premier League

Table

Results summary

Results by round

Matches

Pre-season friendlies

Premier League

Results by round

League Cup

FA Cup

Player statistics

Goalscorers
Goalscoring statistics for 2006–07.

References

Notes

External links
Fulham's official website
Fulham on BBC Sport

Fulham F.C. seasons
Fulham